Joe Thein (born 17 July 1991 in Esch-sur-Alzette) is a Luxembourgish politician and former councillor.

He is living in Lamadelaine in the commune of Pétange. He supports the philosophy of conservatism by Edmund Burke.

After obtaining his commercial diploma at the Lycée Technique Mathias Adam, he worked as a flight attendant at the Luxembourgish airline Luxair. Subsequently, he began studies in history at the University of Luxembourg.

Political career

ADR 
He was a member of ADR from 2008 to 2017. He joined the party on 14 July 2008 at the age of 16 as well as its youth organization in 2009. After five years of vice-presidency, he was elected on 16 March 2015 in Luxembourg City as chairman of the youth organization adrenalin. He was also the vice-president of the ADR South region and local section of Pétange, represented in the national and executive board of the party.

In the local elections held on 9 October 2011 he ran at the age of 20 for a seat in the council of Pétange obtaining 403 voices (230 list voices) and the first and only seat for ADR, enabling the party's first local success in the municipality. At the general meeting of the Pétange section, he got designated as head of the list for the upcoming local elections on 8 October 2017.

In the Luxembourg General election held on 20 October 2013 he ran for a seat in the Chamber of Deputies for the south, obtaining 5234 voices (3828 list voices) placing him fourth on the list.

At the congress of the European Young Conservatives in December 2016 in Brussels, he got elected 1. vice-chairman of the board of the European, conservative youth-organizations EYC .

In April 2012, Thein was given a ban on speaking in the lyceum, after students invited the politician, as speaker on the subject of multiculturalism. This led to criticism from the students and his party in the press. Thein himself spoke of a lack of political neutrality of the school administration and boycott.

In April 2014, Thein initiated a petition against the right of foreigners to vote, which was submitted and approved by the Petition Commission of the Chambre des Députés. The aim was, according to Thein, the promotion of Luxembourg's sovereignty and identity, as well as the integration policy in Luxembourg.

On 9 March 2017, after a disciplinary procedure, he was expelled from his party following a controversial "Like" on Facebook. Prior to the measure, the justice proclaimed that no prosecution will be initiated because of no evidence of hatespeech. Yet, the party board voted for his exclusion. Soon after, he announced the possible founding of a "real conservative party."

déi Konservativ (The Conservatives) 
On 21 March 2017 he founded a new political party in Luxembourg called  (“The Conservatives”), of which he is the current chairman. On 10 April he was elected to his political office at the extraordinary national congress of the party, and re-elected with all voices at the annual national congress on 7 January 2018. In the local elections held on 9 October 2017 his party ran with a list in the municipality of Pétange, with Thein as head of list, obtaining 2.40 % as a party result, with a personal vote of 550 voices (66 list voices).

On 29 January 2018 he was elected by the municipality council into the commission of integration for the political term 2017/2023.

In the Luxembourg General election held on 14 October 2018 his party ran with a list in the south, with Thein as head of list, obtaining 0.52 % as party result, with a personal vote of 1,426 voices (266 list voices) placing him first on the list.

In the European Election held on 26 May 2019 his party ran with a list, with Thein as head of list, obtaining 0.53 % as party result, with a personal vote of 1,957 voices.

Other 

Thein describes himself as conservative, classically liberal and patriotic and is close to the Conservatism of Edmund Burke.

He is a sympathizer of AfD. In February 2016 he visited an eurosceptical congress of the party in Düsseldorf. A sequence of the ARD broadcaster shows Thein with applause.

In 2016, Thein was portrayed in a short documentary of the documentary series routwäissgro of the film production Calach Films and Kollektiv 13, as well as with the support of the Film Fund Luxembourg and RTL Télé Lëtzebuerg, entitled “Meng Heemecht” and shown on national television RTL.

On 4 February 2018 an attack on Thein's home was attempted. A strong firecracker blew up several windows of Thein's house and party headquarters. A car was also damaged. The police initiated a criminal investigation into the case.

In October 2018, Thein initiated police report against rapper Tun Tonnar (aka Turnup Tun), subsequently followed by a process in March 2019, for his song, entitled "FCK LXB". In the song, the rapper criticizes several Luxembourgish right-wing politicians, including Thein as well as his party Déi Konservativ. In the process on the district court of Luxembourg on 28 March, Thein demanded 5.000 € as damages because of public injury of reputation and insult. A judgement is fixed for 8 May.

Personal life 
Thein is openly homosexual.

References 

Living people
1991 births
People from Esch-sur-Alzette
Luxembourgian politicians
Luxembourgian LGBT people
Luxembourgian LGBT politicians
Gay politicians